The Prêmio Extra de Televisão de melhor ator (English: Extra Television Awards for Best Actor) is a category of the Prêmio Extra de Televisão, destined to the best actor of the Brazilian television.

Winner

1998–2007 
1998 – Tony Ramos in Torre de Babel
1999 – Marco Nanini in Andando nas Nuvens
2000 – Eduardo Moscovis in O Cravo e a Rosa
2001 – Antônio Fagundes in Porto dos Milagres
2002 – Vladimir Brichta in Coração de Estudante
2003 – Tony Ramos in Mulheres Apaixonadas 
2004 – Tony Ramos in Cabocla
2005 – Murilo Rosa in América
2006 – Lázaro Ramos in Cobras & Lagartos
2007 – Wagner Moura in Paraíso Tropical

2008–present 
2008 – Antônio Fagundes in Duas Caras
Edson Celulari in Beleza Pura
Daniel Dantas in Ciranda de Pedra
Murilo Benício in A Favorita
Leonardo Brício in Chamas da Vida
 2009 – Rodrigo Lombardi in Caminho das Índias
Ângelo Paes Leme in A Lei e o Crime
Eriberto Leão in Paraíso
Felipe Camargo in Som & Fúria
Marcelo Serrado in Poder Paralelo
Tony Ramos in Caminho das Índias
 2010 – Murilo Benício in Ti Ti Ti
Ângelo Paes Leme in Ribeirão do Tempo
Mateus Solano in Viver a Vida
Alexandre Borges in Ti Ti Ti
Tony Ramos in Passione
Alexandre Nero in Escrito nas Estrelas
 2011 – Gabriel Braga Nunes in Insensato Coração
Bruno Gagliasso in Cordel Encantado
Cauã Reymond in Cordel Encantado
Jorge Fernando in Macho Man
Rodrigo Lombardi in O Astro
Selton Mello in A Mulher Invisível
2012 – Marcelo Serrado in Fina Estampa
Antonio Fagundes in Gabriela
Cauã Reymond in Avenida Brasil
Marcelo Novaes in Avenida Brasil
Murilo Benício in Avenida Brasil
Ricardo Tozzi in Cheias de Charme
2013 – Mateus Solano in Amor à Vida
Antonio Fagundes in Amor à Vida
Lázaro Ramos in Lado a Lado
Malvino Salvador in Amor à Vida
Marco Pigossi in Sangue Bom
Thiago Fragoso in Lado a Lado
2014 – Alexandre Nero in Império
Cauã Reymond in Amores Roubados
Chay Suede in Império
Humberto Martins in Em Família
Irandhir Santos in Meu Pedacinho de Chão
Osmar Prado in Meu Pedacinho de Chão
2015 – Rodrigo Lombardi in Verdades Secretas
Alexandre Nero in A Regra do Jogo
Caio Castro in I Love Paraisópolis
Cauã Reymond in A Regra do Jogo
Enrique Diaz in Felizes para Sempre?
Tony Ramos in A Regra do Jogo
2016 – Domingos Montagner in Velho Chico
Felipe Simas in Totalmente Demais
Jesuíta Barbosa in Justiça
João Baldasserini in Haja Coração
Rodrigo Santoro in Velho Chico
Sérgio Guizé in Êta Mundo Bom!

References

External links 
Official website

Television awards for Best Actor
Prêmio Extra de Televisão
1998 establishments in Brazil